George Bruce Cortelyou (July 26, 1862October 23, 1940) was an American Cabinet secretary of the early twentieth century. He held various positions in the presidential administrations of Grover Cleveland, William McKinley, and Theodore Roosevelt.

Born in New York City, Cortelyou worked for the United States Post Office Department, earning the attention of Postmaster General Wilson S. Bissell. On Bissell's recommendation, President Cleveland hired Cortelyou as his chief clerk. On Cleveland's recommendation, McKinley hired Cortelyou as his personal secretary. After the assassination of William McKinley, Roosevelt asked Cortelyou to lead an effort to reorganize the White House.

Impressed by Cortelyou's performance, Roosevelt appointed Cortelyou to the position of United States Secretary of Commerce and Labor in 1903. He left that position in 1904 to become the Chairman of the Republican National Committee, and starting in 1905 he also served as the Postmaster General. He left both of those positions to become the United States Secretary of the Treasury in 1907. In that position, he worked to keep the economy stable during the Panic of 1907. After Roosevelt left office in 1909, Cortelyou became president of the Consolidated Gas Company. He died in 1940.

Early life
Cortelyou was born in New York City to Rose (née Seary) and Peter Crolius Cortelyou, Jr. He was part of an old New Netherland family whose immigrant ancestor, Jacques Cortelyou, arrived in 1652. He was educated at public schools in Brooklyn, the Nazareth Hall Military Academy in Pennsylvania, and the Hempstead Institute on Long Island.

At 20, Cortelyou received a BA degree from Westfield Normal School, now Westfield State University, a teacher's college in Westfield, Massachusetts. He graduated from the law schools of George Washington University and Georgetown University. He was a member of Phi Sigma Kappa fraternity while at George Washington University. Courtelyou then began teaching, later taking a stenography course and mastering shorthand.  Cortelyou married the former Lily Morris Hinds on September 15, 1888, with whom he had five children.

Early career 
In 1891 he obtained a position as secretary to the chief postal inspector of New York. The following year a promotion led to a job as the secretary to the Fourth Assistant Postmaster General in Washington, D.C. In 1895 President Grover Cleveland hired Cortelyou as his chief clerk on the recommendation of Postmaster General Wilson S. Bissell. Cleveland recommended him as a personal secretary to his successor, William McKinley. Cortelyou was working on improvements in office efficiency in 1901, when President McKinley was assassinated.

McKinley was greeting visitors in the Temple of Music at the Pan-American Exposition on September 6, 1901, in Buffalo, New York, when he was shot twice at close range by lone assassin Leon Czolgosz. As McKinley collapsed, he was caught and supported by his aides, among them Cortelyou. As he was held in their arms, he whispered, "My wife... be careful, Cortelyou, how you tell her. Oh, be careful."

After succeeding as President, Theodore Roosevelt tasked Cortelyou with transforming the White House into a more professional organization. Cortelyou developed procedures and rules that guided White House protocol and established processes for which there had been only personal prerogative. Cortelyou is also credited with establishing an improved line of communication between the President's office and the press; he provided reporters with their own workspace, briefed journalists on notable news and handed out press releases. Cortelyou is credited with instituting the first systematic gathering of press commentary for a sitting president's perusal. The "current clippings" were the first attempt by a president to gauge public opinion by the media. Cortelyou selected items objectively, a practice that would not be consistently followed by his successors.

Roosevelt's administration
Cortelyou served as the first Secretary of Commerce and Labor, from February 18, 1903, to June 30, 1904. He also served as Postmaster General from March 6, 1905, to January 14, 1907, and was the Secretary of the Treasury, all under Theodore Roosevelt. From 1904 through 1907, Cortelyou also served as Chairman of the Republican National Committee, working for the successful re-election of Theodore Roosevelt.

He was made an honorary member of Phi Mu Alpha Sinfonia fraternity on April 9, 1903. He had attended the New England Conservatory of Music, where the fraternity was founded.

Cortelyou served as the Secretary of the Treasury, from March 4, 1907, to March 7, 1909. This was during the devastating Panic of 1907. Like his predecessor, Leslie M. Shaw, Cortelyou believed it was Treasury's duty to protect the banking system, but he realized that the Treasury was not equipped to maintain economic stability. He eased the crisis by depositing large amounts of government funds in national banks and buying government bonds. To prevent further crises, Cortelyou advocated a more elastic currency and recommended the creation of a central banking system.

In 1908, the Aldrich–Vreeland Act was passed, providing special currency to be issued in times of panic, and creating a commission, which led to the creation of the Federal Reserve in 1913.

Later life, death, and legacy
He returned to private enterprise as the president of the Consolidated Gas Company, later known as the Consolidated Edison.  He was also one of the chairmen of the Con Edison Energy Museum, which is now closed. He lived at his home "Harbor Lights" in Halesite, Long Island, until his death in October 1940. Edith Roosevelt attended the wake at his home, as she was a best friend of his wife.  He is buried at the Memorial Cemetery of St. John's Church in Cold Spring Harbor, New York. Cortelyou, an unincorporated community in Washington County, Alabama, changed its name from Richardson to Cortelyou while George Cortelyou was United States Postmaster General. In 1942 a liberty ship was to be named after him; this ship later became the cargo ship USS Cetus.

References

External links

 

|-

|-

|-

1862 births
1940 deaths
20th-century American politicians
American press secretaries
Assassination of William McKinley
George Washington University Law School alumni
Georgetown University Law Center alumni
New York (state) Republicans
Personal secretaries to the President of the United States
Republican National Committee chairs
Theodore Roosevelt administration cabinet members
United States Postmasters General
United States Secretaries of Commerce and Labor
United States Secretaries of the Treasury
Politicians from New York City